James Madio (born November 22, 1975) is an American actor, known for his roles in USA High, Hook and as Technician Fourth Grade Frank Perconte in Band of Brothers.

Early life
A native of The Bronx, Madio was raised in Morris Park and Pelham Bay.

Career
Madio was born as one of seven children in his family. At the age of 15, he had his first audition in Steven Spielberg's 1991 film Hook. He landed the role of "Don't Ask", one of the Lost Boys. Among the cast of Hook was Academy Award winner Dustin Hoffman, who had been cast as the villainous Captain Hook. Hoffman took notice of Madio and had him cast as his character's son in the 1992 comedy Hero.

He later appeared alongside Leonardo DiCaprio in the 1995 film The Basketball Diaries as a teenage drug addict. In 1997 Madio landed a regular role on the teen sitcom USA High where he played funny-man Bobby Lazzerini during the show's first season.

He has played lead roles in television series including miniseries Band of Brothers, in which he portrayed Frank Perconte. Madio contacted Perconte to develop ideas on how to play the real-life sergeant as well as to understand Perconte's background and history. In 2003 Madio was cast in a main role of Mike Powell on the short-lived CBS courtroom drama Queens Supreme.

In recent years, Madio has been focused on voice-acting and acting in independent films. He made a 2011 guest appearance on an episode of the new TV Land comedy series The Exes. In 2021, Madio was cast as Carmine, right hand to crime boss   Joe Colombo (played by Giovanni Ribisi) in the Paramount+ limited streaming series The Offer, which details the making of the film The Godfather.

Filmography

References

External links
Official website

1975 births
American male film actors
American male television actors
Living people
Male actors from New York City
People from the Bronx
21st-century American male actors
American male child actors
American people of Italian descent